Kojo Musah (born 15 April 1996) is a Danish sprinter. He represented his country at the 2021 European Indoor Championships finishing eighth in the final.

He has a Ghanaian father and a Danish mother.

International competitions

Personal bests
Outdoor
100 metres – 10.29 (+1.1 m/s, Copenhagen 2020)
200 metres – 20.67 (+0.8 m/s, Hvidovre 2020)
Indoor
60 metres – 6.61 (Randers 2021) NR

References

1996 births
Living people
Danish male sprinters
Danish people of Ghanaian descent
Athletes (track and field) at the 2020 Summer Olympics
Olympic athletes of Denmark